Floyd Layne is an American former basketball player and coach. He played college basketball for the City College of New York (CCNY) and was implicated in the point shaving scandal in 1951. Layne was instrumental in the team that won the NIT and NCAA championship in 1950 for CCNY.

Layne played professionally in the Eastern Professional Basketball League (EPBL) from 1954 to 1963. He was selected to the All-EPBL First Team in 1955 and the Second Team in 1956.  He led his team to CBA Finals appearances in 1956-57 (Hazelton) and 1961-62 (Williamsport). Floyd was instrumental in developing Nate Archibald at the Harlem Youth Center. Layne was appointed as head coach of the CCNY basketball team in 1974; he served in that role for 14 years. He previously served as head coach at Queensborough Community College.

References

External links
College statistics
Daily News Article on Floyd Layne
ESPN Classic - Explosion: 1951 scandals threaten college hoops - Joe Goldstein (November 19, 2003)

Year of birth missing (living people)
Living people
American men's basketball coaches
American men's basketball players
CCNY Beavers men's basketball coaches
CCNY Beavers men's basketball players
Scranton Miners (basketball) players
Wilkes-Barre Barons players